The 2005 Supercoppa Italiana was a match contested by 2004–05 Serie A champions Juventus (although subsequently stripped of the title due to Calciopoli) and 2004–05 Coppa Italia winners Internazionale. The match took place on 20 August 2005, and resulted in a 1–0 win for Internazionale after Juan Sebastián Verón's goal in extra time; Juventus' David Trezeguet had scored a regular goal just before half-time but it was not allowed due to a non-existent offside.

Match details

References 

2005
Supercoppa 2005
Supercoppa 2005
Supercoppa Italiana
August 2005 sports events in Europe